Denis Duga (born 5 September 1994) is a Slovak professional footballer who currently plays for Slovak club ViOn Zlaté Moravce.

References

External links
 
 
 Eurofotbal profile 
 Slavia Prague profile

1994 births
Living people
People from Myjava
Sportspeople from the Trenčín Region
Slovak footballers
Slovak expatriate footballers
Slovakia under-21 international footballers
Association football midfielders
Spartak Myjava players
SK Slavia Prague players
FC Sellier & Bellot Vlašim players
FK Senica players
FC ViOn Zlaté Moravce players
Slovak Super Liga players
Czech National Football League players
Expatriate footballers in the Czech Republic
Slovak expatriate sportspeople in the Czech Republic